In mathematics, a topological space  is called countably generated if the topology of  is determined by the countable sets in a similar way as the topology of a sequential space (or a Fréchet space) is determined by the convergent sequences.

The countably generated spaces are precisely the spaces having countable tightness—therefore the name  is used as well.

Definition

Equivalently,  is countably generated if and only if the closure of any  equals the union of closures of all countable subsets of

Countable fan tightness

A topological space  has  if for every point  and every sequence  of subsets of the space  such that  there are finite set  such that 

A topological space  has  if for every point  and every sequence  of subsets of the space  such that  there are points  such that  Every strong Fréchet–Urysohn space has strong countable fan tightness.

Properties

A quotient of a countably generated space is again countably generated. Similarly, a topological sum of countably generated spaces is countably generated. Therefore the countably generated spaces form a coreflective subcategory of the category of topological spaces. They are the coreflective hull of all countable spaces.

Any subspace of a countably generated space is again countably generated.

Examples

Every sequential space (in particular, every metrizable space) is countably generated.

An example of a space which is countably generated but not sequential can be obtained, for instance, as a subspace of Arens–Fort space.

See also

 
 
  − Tightness is a cardinal function related to countably generated spaces and their generalizations.

References

External links

 A Glossary of Definitions from General Topology 
 https://web.archive.org/web/20040917084107/http://thales.doa.fmph.uniba.sk/density/pages/slides/sleziak/paper.pdf

General topology